Mudzar Mohamad sometimes spelt Muadzar Mohamad (born 20 January 1966) is a former Malaysian footballer who was a goalkeeper for Pahang and the Malaysia national football team.

Career
Mudzar starts his football career with Pahang in 1986. A year before, he had played for his local team Bukit Setongkol, and win a local district championship. Scouts for Pahang FA noticed his talent, and offered him a trial for the team. He started playing for the team in the Kings Gold Cup (Piala Emas Raja-Raja in Malay) tournament. He played for Pahang for the entire of his career.

During his time with Pahang, he faced stiff competition for the main goalkeeper position, mainly from Khairul Azman Mohamed who was also his competitor in the Malaysia national football team. After Khairul transferred to Sabah FA in 1996, he was installed as the first choice goalkeeper by head coach Yunus Alif. He retired in 2001 following a career-ending injury.

He also played for Malaysia national futsal team, and was in the squad that took part in the 1996 FIFA Futsal World Championship in Spain.

Coaching career
After retired from playing football, Mudzar turned into coaching, and appointed the goalkeeper coach of Pahang in 2003. Later he resigned from this position, but returned again to Pahang in 2007. He is currently Pahang's goalkeeper coach.

Personal life
Mudzar is married, having 3 children with his wife Zainun Harun, 40. He also has a restaurant, which he managed together with his wife in Kuantan.

Achievements

International
 Runners-up Tiger Cup 1996

Club
With Pahang FA
 Champion 1992 Malaysia Cup
 Runners-up 1994, 1995, 1997 Malaysia Cup
 Champion 1995 M-League

Personal

References

External links
 Mudzar terima bonus paling tinggi
 Pahang 1994
 Sabah muff penalty as Pahang come away as winner
 Malaysia’s No.1 keeper Azmin bags Oliver Kahn Trophy
 Pahang pesta gol
 Azman disenaraikan -- 43 pemain bakal pikul tugas negara
 Dua kelab semakin garang

1966 births
Living people
Malaysian footballers
Malaysia international footballers
Association football goalkeepers
Sri Pahang FC players
People from Pahang
Malaysian people of Malay descent